Isidoro is a masculine given name and a surname related to Isidore. The name is borne by:

People

Given name
 Isidoro Acevedo (communist) (1867–1952), Spanish politician, trade unionist, activist and writer
 Isidoro Álvarez (1935–2014), Spanish businessman
 Isidoro Arredondo (1655–1702), Spanish painter
 Isidoro Bianchi (1581–1662), Italian painter
 Isidoro Blaisten (1933–2004), Argentine writer
 Isidoro Carini (1843–1895), Italian religious, teacher, historian and palaeographer
 Isidoro Chiari (1495–1555), Italian Roman Catholic Bishop of Foligno, a founding father of the Council of Trent and editor
 Isidoro Díaz (born 1938), Mexican former footballer
 Isidoro Diéguez Dueñas (1909–1942), Spanish communist
 Isidoro Falchi (1838–1914), Italian doctor and self-taught archaeologist
 Isidoro Grünhut (1862–1896), Italian painter
 Isidoro Hinestroza (born 1997), Panamanian footballer
 Isidoro Ibarra (born 1992), Argentine field hockey player
 Isidoro Dias Lopes (1865–1949), Brazilian brigadier general, one of the leaders of the 1924 revolt
 Isidoro de María (1815–1906), Uruguayan writer, historian, journalist, politician and diplomat
 Isidoro Pentorio (1568–1622), Roman Catholic prelate and Bishop of Asti
 Isidoro Ruiz (born 1955), Mexican politician
 Isidoro Sain (1869–1932), Croatian Roman Catholic Bishop of Rijeka
 Isidoro San José (born 1955), Spanish retired footballer
 Isidoro Verga (1832–1899), Italian Roman Catholic canon lawyer and cardinal

Surname
 Demetrio Román Isidoro (born 1959), Mexican politician and architect
 Fabrício Isidoro (born 1992), Brazilian footballer
 José Isidoro (born 1986), Spanish football assistant manager and former player
 Micael Isidoro (born 1982), Portuguese road cyclist
 Paulo Isidoro (born 1953), Brazilian former footballer
 Paulo Isidoro (footballer, born 1973), Brazilian former footballer

Fictional characters
 Isidoro Cañones, in Argentine comic books

Masculine given names
Italian masculine given names
Spanish masculine given names